The First Secretary of the Khakassian regional branch of the Communist Party of the Soviet Union was the position of highest authority in the Khakassian NO (1925–1930), Khakassian AO (1930–1991) and the Khakassian ASSR (1991) in the Russian SFSR of the Soviet Union. The position was created in September 1925, and abolished on August 23, 1991. The First Secretary was a de facto appointed position usually by the Politburo or the General Secretary himself.

List of First Secretaries of the Communist Party of Khakassia

Notes

Sources

Regional Committees of the Communist Party of the Soviet Union
Politics of Khakassia
1925 establishments in the Soviet Union
1991 disestablishments in the Soviet Union